Hamden is the name of several places in the United States of America.  It also is a surname.

Places
Hampden, Massachusetts
Hamden, Connecticut
Hamden Township, Becker County, Minnesota
Hamden, Missouri
Hamden, New York
Hamden, Ohio
Hamden, Oklahoma

Name
Erika Hamden, US astrophysicist and Assistant Professor

See also
Hampden (disambiguation)